The Andorra national basketball team is the national team of Andorra. The national team has always represented in the EuroBasket Division C. It also takes part well in Games of the Small States of Europe.

History
Despite not joining FIBA until 1988, Andorra made its debut in the 1985 Games of the Small States of Europe where, after winning their first game ever against Luxembourg, finished in the last position after losing to Cyprus and Malta.

Andorra would come back to competition in 1989, where it achieved its first great success by winning the tournament at the 1989 Games of the Small States of Europe, played in Cyprus after beating the home team in the final by 54–52. In 1991, the team could not repeat success and ended in the fourth position of the 1991 edition, that Andorra hosted.

In 1994, Andorra would make its debut at the FIBA Promotion Cup. In its first participation, the team ended in the seventh position after losing all its five games.

Four years later, the team conquered its first Promotion Cup title by ending unbeaten in the 1998 edition. Andorra would repeat success in 2000 European Promotion Cup for Men for starting to be one of the top teams in the Promotion Cup, later renamed as European Championship for Small Countries.

In 2009, Andorra achieved the bronze medal at the 2009 Games of the Small States of Europe by taking advantage to Iceland in a three-way tie.

During the 2010s, Andorra always qualified for the final of the Championship for Small Countries, being only beaten by more powerful teams like Denmark or Armenia.

Competitive record

Roster
This was the Andorran list for the 2021 FIBA European Championship for Small Countries.

Head to head against other national basketball teams
 Included all FIBA competitions and all GSSE editions.
 Updated as of 3 July 2022.

Individual records
Bold denotes players who played the 2021 FIBA European Championship for Small Countries.
FIBA Championships included since 1998, GSSE included since 2009 and the 2003 edition.

Most capped players

Top scorers

Notable players

Quino Colom (youth teams)
Pere Pràxedes
Guillem Colom
David Navarro

Progression in the FIBA World Ranking

See also
 Andorra men's national under-18 basketball team
 Andorra men's national under-16 basketball team

References

External links
 Andorran Basketball Federation

Men's national basketball teams
Basketball
Basketball in Andorra
1988 establishments in Andorra